Johnson is a common surname in English. 

Johnson may refer to:

People and fictional characters
Johnson (given name), a list of people
 List of people with surname Johnson, including fictional characters
Johnson (composer) (1953–2011), Indian film score composer
Johnson (rapper) (born 1979), Danish rapper
Mr. Johnson (born 1966), Nigerian singer

Places
 Mount Johnson (disambiguation)

Canada
 Johnson, Ontario, township
 Johnson (electoral district), provincial electoral district in Quebec
 Johnson Point (British Columbia), a headland on the north side of the entrance to Belize Inlet

United States
 Johnson, Arizona
 Johnson, Arkansas, a town
 Johnson, Delaware
 Johnson, Indiana, an unincorporated town
 Johnson, Kentucky
 Johnson, Minnesota
 Johnson, Nebraska
 Johnson, New York
 Johnson, Ohio, an unincorporated community
 Johnson, Oklahoma
 Johnson, Utah
 Johnson, Vermont, a town
 Johnson (village), Vermont
 Johnson, Washington
 Johnson, West Virginia
 Johnson, Wisconsin, a town
 Johnson (community), Wisconsin, an unincorporated community
 Johnson City (disambiguation)
 Johnson County (disambiguation)
 Johnson River (disambiguation)
 Johnson Creek (disambiguation)
 Johnson's Island, Ohio, in Lake Erie
 Johnson Island (West Virginia), a bar in the Greenbrier River
 Johnson Township (disambiguation)

Elsewhere
 Johnson Island (Antarctica)
 Johnson Point (South Georgia), a headland on South Georgia

Arts, entertainment, and media
 Johnson, the title character of Johnson and Friends, an Australian children's television series
Antony and the Johnsons, the formation of Antony Hegarty and his band
The Johnsons (band), music group of the English singer composer Antony Hegarty
 Johnson's Dictionary, a dictionary of the English Language by Samuel Johnson

Brands and enterprises
 Big Johnson, a brand of tee shirt marketed by Maryland Brand Management
 E. Normus Johnson, mascot for Big Johnson
 Johnson & Johnson, American pharmaceutical, medical devices and consumer packaged goods manufacturer
 Johnson Controls, a company based in Milwaukee, Wisconsin, U.S.
 Johnson Financial Group, Inc., the holding company of Johnson Bank, Johnson Insurance and Banque Franck, Galland & Cie.
 Johnson Outboards, American motor boat manufacturer

Education
 Johnson & Wales University, Providence, Rhode Island
 Johnson Hall (Eugene, Oregon), the administration building of the University of Oregon
 Johnson Senior High School (St. Paul, Minnesota)
 Johnson State College, Johnson, Vermont
 Johnson University, a private Christian university near Knoxville, Tennessee
 Johnson University Florida, a private Christian university near Kissimmee, Florida
 Sol C. Johnson High School (Savannah, Georgia)

Weapons
 M1941 Johnson machine gun
 M1941 Johnson rifle

Other uses
 Johnson, a slang term for the Human penis
 Johnson Act, a 1934 U.S. securities law
 Johnson Baronets, one title in the Baronetage of Great Britain and two in the Baronetage of the United Kingdom
 Johnson Formation, a geologic formation of shale in Nebraska, Kansas, and Oklahoma
 Johnson counter, also called a Möbius counter, switch-tail ring counter, twisted ring counter, or walking ring counter, or Möbius counter
 Johnson solid, a convex polyhedron in geometry
 Johnson Space Center, in the city of Houston, Texas, U.S.

See also 

 
 
 Jonson 
 Jonsson
 Johnsson
 Johanson
 Johansson